Minnesota State Highway 225 (MN 225) was a  highway in north-central Minnesota, which ran from its intersection with County State-Aid Highway 26 and County Road 129 in the town of Ponsford south and east to its intersection with State Highway 34 in Osage Township of Becker County.

It was removed as a state highway in 2017, and became a county road.

Route description
Highway 225 began in the unincorporated town of Ponsford, at an intersection with County State-Aid Highway 26 (CSAH 26) and County Road 129 (CR 129). It passed by the Carsonville Township town and fire hall before leaving the settlement and traveling amongst farm fields. The roadway curved to the south for a half mile before curving back east, following a section line; the roadway would thenceforth follow section lines for the remainder of its length. After one mile, the road turned southward again at its junction with CR 156 (north) and 270th Street (east). Another mile later, the road turned eastward again, with Guyles Road continuing south and Smokey Hills Road traveling to the west. Two miles afterward, the road turned south yet again at an intersection with Straight Lake Road heading north, and Eagle Bay Avenue heading east to Straight Lake. Another mile south, the highway turned east for the final time and then a mile subsequently reached the junction where it made its final turn south, connecting with Park Trail going north and Washington Drive continuing east. It traveled for one more mile before reaching its terminus at State Highway 34.

The route was legally defined as Route 225 in the Minnesota Statutes.

History
Highway 225 was authorized on July 1, 1949. The route was paved at the time it was marked.

It had been part of the original routing of State Highway 34 until it was realigned in 1941.

The highway was removed from statute during the state Legislature's 2017 special session, and turned over to Becker County maintenance on September 1, 2017, becoming CSAH 26. MnDOT provided $9.5 million to the county for future improvements as part of the ownership transfer.

Major intersections

References

External links

Highway 225 at the Unofficial Minnesota Highways Page

225
Transportation in Becker County, Minnesota